Engineering and the Mind's Eye (1992) is a book by Eugene S. Ferguson, an engineer and historian of science and technology.  It was published by MIT Press.  In it, Ferguson discusses the importance of the mind's eye for the practicing engineer, including spatial visualization and visual thinking.

A major argument of the book is summarized as follows in the preface:

The book comprises 7 chapters and two additional sections on notes about the text and its figures.  The chapters are:
The Nature of Engineering Design
The Mind's Eye
Origins of Modern Engineering
The Tools of Visualization
The Development and Dissemination of Engineering Knowledge
The Making of an Engineer
The Gap between Promise and Performance.

References

External links
 Eugene Shallcross Ferguson papers at Hagley Museum and Library

1992 non-fiction books
Engineering books
Science books